Salvator Rosa is a station on line 1 of the Naples Metro. It was opened on 5 April 2001 as part of the section the line between Vanvitelli and Museo. The station is located between Quattro Giornate and Materdei. Materdei station was added to the line on 5 July 2003, and before that date, the adjacent station was Museo.

The station is named after the neighboring street, Via Salvator Rosa, which in turn is named after the painter Salvator Rosa.

References

Naples Metro stations
Railway stations opened in 2001
2001 establishments in Italy
Railway stations in Italy opened in the 21st century